Marco Ferdinand William Vasquez-d'Acugno Vassi (November 6, 1937 in New York City – January 14, 1989, in New York City) was an American experimental thinker and author, most noted for his erotica. He wrote fiction and nonfiction, publishing hundreds of short stories, articles, more than a dozen novels, and at least one play, "The Re-Enactment," (under the name of Fred Vassi) at the Caffe Cino in January 1966. Many of his works appeared as "Anonymous" in their first printings. He is most often compared to Henry Miller, has been called the greatest erotic writer of his time and "foremost of his generation," and praised by Norman Mailer, Gore Vidal, Saul Bellow, and Kate Millett.

Biography
Vassi was born and lived most of his life in New York City. He was married three times, but was well known for sexual, drug, and alternative-lifestyle experimentation. He viewed life as the theory and practice of liberation, an exploration of being sexual, that is an all-sexual being, bisexual, and homosexual. Vassi coined the term metasex, which meant any sex outside the bounds of heterosexual marriage. He once wrote in Beyond Bisexuality:

When one transcends male-female dualism, eroticism becomes susceptible of a more subtle mathematical understanding. For each number, there is a different and unique quality of consciousness, and no one is intrinsically superior to any of the others. ... It is also fascinating to wonder whether *zero,* or metacelibacy, may be seen not as a renunciation but as an embrace of all metasex ...
The introduction of the metasexual paradigm is no less a shift in the history of our evolving understanding. The vast majority of the species has not seen past the conditioned strictures of the number *two.* And even those in the vanguard, having their orgies, still operate from the standpoint of a male-female dualism. The most sophisticated among them proclaim themselves bisexuals, not aware that this is the dead-end of that particular tunnel vision. The only way out is to go within to heal the internal split. A monad has no gender.

His biography in the book PoMoSexuals: challenging assumptions about gender and sexuality  states, in part: "Marco Vassi was a literary avatar of the sexual revolution. He was deeply attuned to the politics of sex and sexual orientation, as well as the intersection of sex and spirituality. In his writing, as in his life (until his AIDS diagnosis), he explored fearlessly, bringing back dispatches from sexual frontiers most people never visited."

Vassi helped found the alternative media thinktank RainDance in 1969.

He died January 14, 1989, from pneumonia due to AIDS. According to the writer John Heidenry, despite his erotic explorations and adventuring, Vassi was tragically unable to sustain a love relationship, and died alone, with only the care of his former girlfriend Annie Sprinkle. Marco is survived by his son Eric Van Johnson.

Publishing history
His works have been reissued by numerous publishers over the years. In 1992, The Vassi Collection, a definitive ten-volume set of his works from Permanent Press, was published.

Published works

Novels
 The Gentle Degenerates (1972)
 The Saline Solution (1972)
 Contours of Darkness (1972)
 Mind Blower (1972)
 In Touch (1975: Manor Books Inc, NY)
 Couples, Loving Couples (1977)
 The Erotic Comedies (1981)
 Lying Down: The Horizontal Worldview (1984)
 The Other Hand Clapping (1987)
 A Driving Passion (1992)
 Play Time (1992)
 The Sensual Mirror (1992)
 Tackling the Team (1993)
 Devil's Sperm Is Cold (1993)
 Slave Lover (1993)

Autobiography
 The Stoned Apocalypse (1973)

Collections
 Metasex, Mirth and Madness: Erotic Tales of the Absurdly Real (1975)
 The Metasex Manifesto: Erotic Tales of the Absurdly Real (1976)
 The Wonderful World of Penthouse Sex (1976) (editor)
 Erotica from Penthouse (1990)

Nonfiction
 Pushing Ink: The Fine Art of Tattooing (1979)

Bibliography
Heidenry, John (1997) What Wild Ecstasy: the rise and fall of the sexual revolution. New York: Simon and Schuster. Reviewed by Robert Christgau in The New York Times, April 27, 1997.

References

External links
 Erotic By Nature: MARCO VASSI: MY AUNT NETTIE; WHERE'S WALDO?

1937 births
1989 deaths
AIDS-related deaths in New York (state)
LGBT people from New York (state)
Bisexual men
Deaths from pneumonia in New York City
American people of Italian descent
20th-century American LGBT people
American bisexual writers